Mogiel  is a village in the administrative district of Gmina Lipnica, within Bytów County, Pomeranian Voivodeship, in northern Poland. The village has a population of 18.

References

Mogiel